Fernand Mailly (26 February 1873) was a French actor.

Born Fernand Jean-Paul Anne in Le Havre, Seine-Maritime, France.

Selected filmography
 Brigadier Gerard (1915)
 Le traquenard (1915)
 The Empire of Diamonds (1920)
The Agony of the Eagles (1922)
 Le Miracle des loups (1924)
 Mare Nostrum (1926)
 Education of a Prince (1927)
 André Cornélis (1927)
 Saint Joan the Maid (1929)
 Temptation (1929)
 Imperial Violets (1932)
 Inspecteur Grey (1936)
 The Mysterious Lady (1936)
 The Patriot (1938)

References

External links

1873 births
Year of death unknown
Male actors from Le Havre
French male film actors
French male silent film actors
20th-century French male actors